Fattal is a surname. Notable people with the surname include:

 Hubert Fattal (1970–2022), Lebanese businessman
 Joshua Fattal, US hiker detained by Iran in 2009
 Michel Fattal (born 1954), French-language author
 Wahid El Fattal (born 1978), Lebanese football player and coach

See also
 Fatal (disambiguation)